Synbranchinae is a subfamily of swamp eel, consisting of six of the ten genera in the family Synbranchidae. The remaining genus, the monotypic Macrotrema is the only one in the other subfamily Macrotreminae. The subfamily occurs in the Neotropics, Afrotropics and Asia.

Genera
The following genera are classified in the Synbranchinae:

 Monopterus Lacepède, 1800
Ophichthys Swainson, 1839
Rakthamichthys Britz, Dahanukar, Standing, Philip, Kumar & Raghavan, 2020
Typhlosynbranchus Pellegrin, 1922
 Synbranchus Bloch, 1795
 Ophisternon McClelland, 1844

References

Fish subfamilies
Synbranchidae
Taxa named by Charles Lucien Bonaparte